Squamish Airport  is located  north of Squamish, British Columbia, Canada.

It is used for charter services, private aircraft, flying clubs, and other commercial activities. Given its close proximity to Greater Vancouver, there is no regularly scheduled air service at the Squamish Airport. The airport was also used by the Canadian Forces as part of their preparation for the 2010 Vancouver Winter Olympics.

References

Registered aerodromes in British Columbia
Sea-to-Sky Corridor